William Henry (Bullock) Hall  (5 April 1837 – 21 April 1904) was an English first-class cricketer, journalist and military historian.

Family and early life

The son of Henry Robert Bullock, he was born into the Bullock family at Faulkbourne, Essex in April 1837. He was educated at Rugby School, before going up to Balliol College, Oxford where he studied classical moderations.

Cricketer

While studying at Oxford, he played first-class cricket for Oxford University, making his debut against the Marylebone Cricket Club at Oxford in 1857. He made four further first-class appearances for Oxford, with a further appearance in 1857 followed by two in 1858 and one in 1859. Bullock scored 207 runs in his five matches, at an average of 29.57 and with a high score of 78.

Journalist

After he graduated from Oxford, he was a member of Lincoln's Inn but did not become a barrister and instead traveled to Italy, Egypt and the Holy Land. He then chose to become a journalist in the employment of The Daily News.

Poland

He was the newspaper's special correspondent and reported on the Polish Insurrection in 1863-1864 following which he wrote a book, Polish Experiences, published by Macmillan in 1864. His hosts, during his travels, included the Tarnowski family. Bullock described visiting the family seat at Dzików Castle where he met Count Jan Tarnowski and his two brothers, Juliusz Tarnowski and Stanisław Tarnowski. Juliusz was killed 2 weeks later fighting the Russians whilst Stanisław was condemned by the Austrians to 12-year solitary confinement in the Wawel Castle. Some months later, as Bullock returned from his wider travels back to Kraków, he sought permission to visit Stanisław in prison. Although permission was formally granted, access was denied on the morning of his visit.

Other assignments

He also covered the Second French intervention in Mexico in 1864–65, writing Across Mexico in 1864-5, and represented the paper in Rome from 1866 to 1867. He became an ardent partisan of the Italian Revolutionary movement fighting with Garibaldi from whom he received personal thanks.

Philanthropy

Bullock was keenly interested in movements of practical philanthropy: encouraging fruit growing in Ireland by free gifts of trees, building improved dwellings in the slums of the East End of London and erecting model cottages for those working on his estates.

Later life

He changed his surname in 1872, assuming the name Hall, in lieu of Bullock, on the inheritance of the Cambridgeshire estates of his uncle, General John Hall of Weston Colville and Six Mile Bottom. He was also a military historian, writing books on the subject. Having served as a deputy lieutenant and justice of the peace for Cambridgeshire, he later served as the High Sheriff of Cambridgeshire and Huntingdonshire in 1891. He was resident at Six Mile Bottom in Cambridgeshire and also had a villa at Valscure in France at Saint-Raphaël, where he died in April 1904 after a short illness resulting from paralysis.

References

External links

1837 births
1904 deaths
People from Braintree District
People educated at Rugby School
Alumni of Balliol College, Oxford
English cricketers
Oxford University cricketers
Members of Lincoln's Inn
English reporters and correspondents
English non-fiction writers
19th-century English historians
British military historians
English justices of the peace
Deputy Lieutenants of Cambridgeshire
High Sheriffs of Cambridgeshire and Huntingdonshire